Four Seasons Place Kuala Lumpur, also known as Four Seasons KLCC and FSP KLCC Tower, is a 74-story,  supertall skyscraper in Kuala Lumpur City Centre, Malaysia. It is Malaysia's fourth tallest building. It is located within the Kuala Lumpur City Centre precinct in Kuala Lumpur, Malaysia. The building was developed by Ipoh-born Singapore tycoon, Ong Beng Seng, partnering Tan Sri Syed Yusof Tun Syed Nasir and the Sultan of Selangor under Venus Assets Sdn Bhd. It is currently the fourth tallest building in Malaysia.

Shoppes at Four Seasons Place 

The hotel includes an atrium mall known as Shoppes at Four Seasons Place, also known as Shoppes @ Four Seasons Place KL, located at the ground levels. It is a luxury retail mall which is connected to the building itself and takes up six levels of the tower. Its sister mall is located at the Four Seasons Hotel Macao, Cotai Strip under the name of "Shoppes at Four Seasons". Recently in October 2020, the Robinsons announced that they will be closing their department store at the mall along with its outlet in The Gardens Mall located at Mid Valley City.

Launch 
This project which is the first-ever Four Seasons Place in South East Asia, was launched by the former Prime Minister of Malaysia, Najib Razak on 30 January 2013. This event was also accompanied by the Chairman of Venus Assets, Tan Sri Syed Yusof, and witnessed by Sultan Sharafuddin Idris Shah. The project was completed in 2018.

Criticism 
The hotel's design and the location were criticised for blocking the view of the national icon, the Petronas Towers. The Malaysian Association of Tour and Travel Agents (MATTA) President KL Tan said in an interview to Channel NewsAsia. "Our Twin Towers are an iconic tourist attraction - they should not be blocked at all. Tourists want to have a nice view and take photos of the twin towers, once the tallest buildings in the world." To defend against this criticism, the then Malaysia's Minister of Tourism and Culture, Nazri Aziz said that "There are those who are willing to pay to stay in such hotels and there would be tourists who would visit a place just to stay in such a hotel."

Transportation access
The building is served by the  KLCC LRT station on the Kelana Jaya Line. The building will also have access to the upcoming underground station on the Putrajaya Line (SSP) which will be the  Persiaran KLCC MRT station, formerly KLCC East station.

See also
 List of tallest hotels
 List of tallest buildings in Malaysia
List of tallest buildings in Kuala Lumpur
List of shopping malls in Malaysia
 Merdeka 118
 The Exchange 106

References

External links 

 Four Seasons Hotel Kuala Lumpur website
 Shoppes at Four Seasons Place website
 Official Website of Four Seasons

Hotels in Kuala Lumpur
Four Seasons hotels and resorts
Hotel buildings completed in 2018
2018 establishments in Malaysia
Skyscraper hotels in Kuala Lumpur